Ciryl Jacky Gane (born 12 April 1990) is a French professional mixed martial artist. He currently competes in the Heavyweight division in the Ultimate Fighting Championship (UFC), where he is a former Interim UFC Heavyweight Champion. A professional fighter since 2014, Gane has also formerly competed for TKO Major League MMA where he was the Heavyweight Champion. As of March 29, 2022, he is #1 in the UFC heavyweight rankings.

Early life
Gane was born in La Roche-sur-Yon, and is of Guadeloupean descent through his father. His father, Romain Gane was a bus driver, and footballer in the Division d'Honneur. As a youth, Gane played football and basketball. Despite his sporting talent, Gane decided to work in sales at a furniture store and he joined a work-study program in Paris. During this time, a former classmate introduced Gane to Muay Thai.

Muay Thai career
Gane made his professional debut on June 4, 2016, in a AFMT Muay thai heavyweight title fight against Jérémy Jeanne. He won the fight by a second-round knockout.

After a decision win against Samih Bachar, Gane was scheduled to fight the K-1 veteran Brice Guidon at La Nuit Des Titans. He beat Guidon by a third-round knockout.

Gane was scheduled to defend his AFMT title against Jonathan Gengoul at Muay Thai Spirit 5. He won the fight by a first-round knockout.

At Warriors Night, Gane beat Bangaly Keita by a third-round knockout. He was then scheduled to fight the multiple-time WBC Muaythai champion Yassine Boughanem at Duel 2. Gane won the fight by decision.

Mixed martial arts career

Early career
Coached by Fernand Lopez, Ciryl Gane made his professional MMA debut in 2018. He was first contracted to the Canadian MMA promotion TKO, where his first fight was for the vacant TKO heavyweight championship, against Bobby Sullivan. He won the title fight in the first round through a front choke.

He defended the heavyweight championship a month later against Adam Dyczka, winning the fight in the second round via a TKO. His third fight in TKO, and his second title defense, was against Roggers Souza, which he won in the first round by a TKO.

Ultimate Fighting Championship
Gane made his promotional debut on August 10, 2019 at UFC Fight Night: Shevchenko vs. Carmouche 2 against Raphael Pessoa. Gane won the fight by an arm triangle choke at the end of the first round.

Gane faced Don'Tale Mayes on October 26, 2019 at UFC Fight Night: Maia vs. Askren. Gane won the fight via a heel hook in the third round, earning him a Performance of the Night bonus.

Gane faced Tanner Boser on December 21, 2019 at UFC Fight Night: Edgar vs. The Korean Zombie. He won the fight via unanimous decision.

Gane was scheduled to face Shamil Abdurakhimov on April 18, 2020 at UFC 249. However, on March 5, 2020 it was announced that Gane was forced to pull out from the event after suffering pneumothorax during training. The bout was eventually rescheduled for July 11, 2020 at UFC 251.  Subsequently, the pairing was cancelled a second time and scrapped from this event in mid-June as Abdurakhimov was removed from the bout for undisclosed reasons. In turn, Gane was expected to face Sergei Pavlovich on August 8, 2020 at UFC Fight Night 174. Pavlovich however had to pull out because of an injury. Therefore the original fight against Shamil Abdurakhimov was scheduled again on September 26, 2020 at UFC 253; however, the bout was rescheduled again to UFC Fight Night 180 on October 18, 2020. The bout fell through once again as Abdurakhimov pulled out due to undisclosed reasons on September 28, 2020 and he was replaced by promotional newcomer Ante Delija. On October 14, 2020, it was announced that the bout was cancelled due to Delija's contractual problems with his previous deal with the PFL.

Gane faced Junior dos Santos on December 12, 2020 at UFC 256. He won the fight via technical knockout in the second round.

Gane faced Jairzinho Rozenstruik on February 27, 2021 at UFC Fight Night 186. He won the fight via unanimous decision.

Gane faced Alexander Volkov on June 26, 2021 at UFC Fight Night 190. He won the fight via unanimous decision.

Gane faced Derrick Lewis on August 7, 2021 at UFC 265 for the Interim UFC Heavyweight Championship. He won the one-sided fight via technical knockout in round three. This fight earned him the  Performance of the Night award.

Gane faced Francis Ngannou for the UFC Heavyweight Championship on January 22, 2022 at UFC 270. Gane was ahead after the first two rounds, but Ngannou switched to wrestling and controlled him for the majority rounds three through five. He lost the fight via unanimous decision, marking his first defeat in any martial arts competition.

Gane faced Tai Tuivasa on September 3, 2022 at UFC Fight Night 209. He won the fight via knockout in round three. This fight earned him the Fight of the Night award.

Gane faced Jon Jones for the vacant UFC Heavyweight Championship on March 4, 2023, at UFC 285. He lost the bout via a guillotine choke submission in the first round.

Personal life 
Gane and his wife have two daughters. They live in Nogent-sur-Marne, in the eastern suburbs of Paris.

Championships and accomplishments

Muay Thai
Académie Française de Muay Thai
AFMT National Title +91 kg (+201 lb) (One time)
One successful title defense

Mixed martial arts
Ultimate Fighting Championship
Interim UFC Heavyweight Championship (one time)
Performance of the Night (two times) 
Fight of the Night (one time) 
TKO Major League MMA
TKO World Heavyweight Championship (One time)
Two successful title defenses
Sherdog
2021 Breakthrough Fighter of the Year

Mixed martial arts record

|-
|Loss
|align=center|11–2
|Jon Jones
|Submission (guillotine choke)
|UFC 285
|
|align=center|1
|align=center|2:04
|Las Vegas, Nevada, United States
|
|-
|Win
|align=center|11–1
|Tai Tuivasa
|KO (punches)
|UFC Fight Night: Gane vs. Tuivasa
|
|align=center|3
|align=center|4:23
|Paris, France
|
|-
|Loss
|align=center|10–1
|Francis Ngannou
|Decision (unanimous)
|UFC 270
|
|align=center|5
|align=center|5:00
|Anaheim, California, United States
|
|-
|Win
|align=center|10–0
|Derrick Lewis
|TKO (punches)
|UFC 265
|
|align=center|3
|align=center|4:11
|Houston, Texas, United States
|
|-
|Win
|align=center|9–0
|Alexander Volkov
|Decision (unanimous)
|UFC Fight Night: Gane vs. Volkov 
|
|align=center|5
|align=center|5:00
|Las Vegas, Nevada, United States
|
|-
|Win
|align=center|8–0
|Jairzinho Rozenstruik
|Decision (unanimous)
|UFC Fight Night: Rozenstruik vs. Gane
|
|align=center|5
|align=center|5:00
|Las Vegas, Nevada, United States
|
|-
|Win
|align=center|7–0
|Junior dos Santos
|TKO (elbow)
|UFC 256
|
|align=center|2
|align=center|2:34
|Las Vegas, Nevada, United States
|
|-
|Win
|align=center|6–0
|Tanner Boser
|Decision (unanimous)
|UFC Fight Night: Edgar vs. The Korean Zombie
|
|align=center|3
|align=center|5:00
|Busan, South Korea
|
|-
|Win
|align=center|5–0
|Don'Tale Mayes
|Submission (heel hook)
|UFC Fight Night: Maia vs. Askren
|
|align=center|3
|align=center|4:46
|Kallang, Singapore
|
|-
|Win
|align=center|4–0
||Raphael Pessoa
|Submission (arm-triangle choke)
|UFC Fight Night: Shevchenko vs. Carmouche 2
|
|align=Center|1
|align=center|4:12
|Montevideo, Uruguay 
|
|-
|Win
|align=center|3–0
|Roggers Souza
|TKO (punches)
|TKO 48: Souza vs Gane
|
|align=Center|1
|align*center|4:26
|Gatineau, Quebec, Canada
|
|-
|Win
|align=center|2–0
|Adam Dyczka
|TKO (punches)
|TKO 44: Hunter vs Barriault
|
|align=Center|2
|align*center|4:57
|Québec City, Quebec, Canada
|
|-
|Win
|align=center|1–0
|Bobby Sullivan
|Submission (guillotine choke)
|TKO Fight Night 1
|
|align=Center|1
|align*center|1:42
|Montreal, Quebec, Canada
|

Pay-per-view bouts

Muay Thai record

|- style="background:#cfc;"
|
| Win
| style="text-align:left" |  Daniel Lentie
|La Nuit De l'Impact IV
| style="text-align:left" |  Saintes, France
| TKO
| 1
| N/A
| 13–0
|-
|- style="background:#cfc;"
|
| Win
| style="text-align:left" |  Yassine Boughanem
|Duel 2
| style="text-align:left" |  Paris, France
| Decision
| 3
| 3:00
| 12–0
|-
|- style="background:#cfc;"
|
| Win
| style="text-align:left" |  Bangaly Keita
|Warriors Night
| style="text-align:left" |  Paris, France
| TKO
| 3
| N/A
| 11–0
|-
|- style="background:#cfc;"
|
| Win
| style="text-align:left" |  Jonathan Gengoul
|Muay Thai Spirit 5
| style="text-align:left" |  Les Herbiers, France
| KO
| 1
| N/A
| 10–0
|-
! style=background:white colspan=9 |
|-
|- style="background:#cfc;"
|
| Win
| style="text-align:left" |  Brice Guidon
|La Nuit Des Titans
| style="text-align:left" |  Tours, France
| TKO
| 3
| N/A
| 9–0
|-
|- style="background:#cfc;"
|
| Win
| style="text-align:left" |  Samih Bachar
|Gala des 5 Nations
| style="text-align:left" |  Nanterre, France
| Decision
| 3
| 3:00
| 8–0
|-
|- style="background:#cfc;"
|
| Win
| style="text-align:left" |  Jérémy Jeanne
|Hurricane Fighting 3
| style="text-align:left" |  Châlons-en-Champagne, France
| TKO
| 2
| N/A
| 7–0
|-
! style=background:white colspan=9 |
|-
|- style="background:#cfc;"
|April 2, 2016
| Win
| style="text-align:left" |  Imed Souissi
| 8e Défi des Champions
| style="text-align:left" |  M’Saken, Tunisie
|KO
|1
|N/A
|6–0
|-
|- style="background:#cfc;"
|December 10, 2015
|Win
| style="text-align:left" |  Brandon Mobi
|Paris Fight
| style="text-align:left" |  Paris, France
|Decision
|3
|3:00
|5–0
|-
|- style="background:#cfc;"
|October 31, 2015
|Win
| style="text-align:left" |  Brandon Mobi
|Show Thaï 13
| style="text-align:left" |  Aubervilliers, France
|Decision
|3
|3:00
|4–0
|-
|- style="background:#cfc;"
|
|Win
| style="text-align:left" |  Jonathan Gengoul
|Show Thaï 12
| style="text-align:left" |  Aubervilliers, France
|KO
|2
|N/A
|3–0
|-
|- style="background:#cfc;"
|
|Win
| style="text-align:left" |  Yann Kouadja
|Super Fight
| style="text-align:left" |  Paris, France
|KO
|2
|N/A
|2–0
|-
|- style="background:#cfc;"
|
|Win
| style="text-align:left" |  Cyril Omahri
|Show Thaï 10
| style="text-align:left" |  Aubervilliers, France
|KO
|1
|N/A
|1–0
|-
| colspan=9 | Legend:    Source: muaythaitv.fr

See also
List of current UFC fighters
List of male mixed martial artists

References

External links
 
 

Living people
Sportspeople from Paris
Heavyweight mixed martial artists
Mixed martial artists utilizing Muay Thai
French male mixed martial artists
French male kickboxers
French Muay Thai practitioners
Ultimate Fighting Championship male fighters
French people of Guadeloupean descent
Ultimate Fighting Championship champions
1990 births